Slovene minority in Italy, also known as Slovenes in Italy is the name given to Italian citizens who belong to the autochthonous Slovene ethnic and linguistic minority living in the Italian autonomous region of Friuli – Venezia Giulia. The vast majority of members of the Slovene ethnic minority live in the Provinces of Trieste, Gorizia, and Udine. Estimates of their number vary significantly; the official figures show 52,194 Slovenian speakers in Friuli-Venezia Giulia, as per the 1971 Census, but Slovenian estimates speak of 83,000 to 100,000 people.

The Slovene minority in Italy enjoys legal protection of its collective rights, guaranteed by the Italian constitution and specific legislation, as well as by international treaties (especially the London Memorandum of 1954), and bilateral agreements initially stipulated first between Italy and Yugoslavia (especially the Treaty of Osimo of 1975), and since 1991 between Italy and Slovenia.

Since 1945, the Slovenes in Italy have enjoyed partial cultural autonomy, including an education system in Slovene. They have a wide net of cultural and civic associations. The Slovene language is co-official in many of the municipalities with presence of the Slovene minority, and visual bilingualism is applied in most of the non-urban settlements with traditional Slovene presence. However, the implementation of these rights largely depends on the local administrations; thus, the situation varies significantly from area to area. 
 
Both Italy and Slovenia promote Slovene culture in Friuli–Venezia Giulia through subsidies for Slovene associations and organizations.

Name 
The denomination “Slovenes in Italy” is preferred to “Italian Slovenes” or “Slovene Italians” due to historical reasons and reasons of identity. The Slovenes of the Julian March or Venezia Giulia (the present-day Provinces of Trieste and Gorizia) became Italian citizens only with the Treaty of Rapallo of 1920. In the late 1920s and 1930s, many of them supported underground anti-Fascist groups, such as TIGR. During World War II large portions of the population took part in the Yugoslav partisan movement, and between 1945 and 1947, many of them actively supported the annexation to Yugoslavia. In the aftermath of World War II, their integration in the Italian state was slow and difficult: much of the anti-Slav Fascist legislation (for example, the forced Italianization of family names) remained valid, and in the context of the Cold War, the Slovene minority was regarded by many political parties, as well as by segments of State institutions, as a potential Yugoslav Trojan Horse.

After 1947, the term zamejski Slovenci (literally, 'Slovenes beyond the border') started to be used by the Yugoslav press and institutions, especially in Slovenia. Initially, this term referred to all Slovene minorities residing outside Yugoslavia (in addition to the Slovenes in Italy, also the Carinthian Slovenes and Hungarian Slovenes). This is still the way the term is used by state institutions in Slovenia. However, because alternative terms exist for the Slovene minorities in Austria and Hungary, the term zamejski Slovenci or Zamejci (< za 'behind' + meja 'border' + ci, a suffix) tends to be used mostly for the Slovenes in Italy. This term is often used also by the Slovenes in Italy themselves, and it is considered a neutral and politically correct term.

Geographical extension 

The Slovene minority in Italy lives in the autonomous region Friuli – Venezia Giulia, more precisely, in the provinces of Trieste, Gorizia and Udine. Slovene immigrants living in other parts of Italy are not considered as members of the minority.
Slovenes live along the border with Slovenia. Their traditional area of settlement includes:
 the hinterland territory of the Province of Trieste (except for the town center of Muggia, which was until 1945 a homogeneous Istrian Italian urban settlement);
 a thin strip of territory along the border with Slovenia in the Province of Gorizia, including the town of Gorizia;
 the mountainous area of north-east Friuli in the Province of Udine, known historically as Venetian Slovenia, comprising the Natisone Valley, the upper Torre Valley, and the Resia Valley;
 the Canale Valley (Province of Udine) in the north-easternmost part of Italy, on the border with Austria and Slovenia.

Historically, the Slovene minority has been present in 32 municipalities in the region: 6 in the Province of Trieste, 6 in the Province of Gorizia and 20 in the Province of Udine. In 16 of them, they are the majority of the population. In addition to these, since the early 1920s, the Slovenes have been settling in the industrial areas of the lower Isonzo valley, in the lowland areas around Monfalcone, known as Bisiacaria, and in larger Friulian towns (such as Udine, Pordenone, and others). The former are nowadays considered members of the Slovene autochthonous minority and thus enjoy certain collective minority rights, while the latter do not. 
Municipalities with significant presence of the autochthonous Slovene minority are as following.

In the Province of Trieste:
 Duino-Aurisina (Devin-Nabrežina)
 Monrupino (Repentabor)
 Muggia (Milje) 
 San Dorligo della Valle (Dolina)
 Sgonico (Zgonik)
 Trieste (Trst)

In the Province of Gorizia:
 Cormons (Krmin)
 Doberdò del Lago (Doberdob)
 Dolegna del Collio (Dolenje)
 Gorizia (Gorica)
 Monfalcone (Tržič)
 Ronchi dei Legionari (Ronke)
 San Floriano del Collio (Števerjan)
 Savogna d'Isonzo (Sovodnje ob Soči)

In the Province of Udine:
 Attimis (Ahten)
 Cividale del Friuli (Čedad)
 Drenchia (Dreka)
 Grimacco (Grmek or Garmak)
 Lusevera (Bardo or Brdo)
 Montenars (Gorjani)
 Nimis (Neme)
 Pontebba (Tablja)
 Prepotto (Praprotno)
 Pulfero (Podbonesec)
 Resia (Rezija)
 San Leonardo (Podutana or Šent Lienart)
 San Pietro al Natisone (Špeter Slovenov or Špietar)
 Savogna (Sovodnje)
 Stregna (Srednje)
 Taipana (Tipana)
 Tarcento (Čenta)
 Tarvisio (Trbiž)
 Torreano (Tavorjana)

Ethnic and territorial identity 
The Slovene minority in Italy is highly differentiated along geographic, cultural-historical, identity and linguistic lines. 
In cultural-historical terms, three separate groups can be differentiated: the Slovenes of the Julian March (the Provinces of Trieste and Gorizia), the Slovenes from Venetian Slovenia, and the Slovenes from the Canale Valley (in the Province of Udine). Each of these three groups has had a significantly different history, which resulted in different identities. The Slovenes in the Resia Valley are sometimes considered as a fourth group, due to their specific linguistic features and separate identity; nevertheless, they share a common history, as well as similar cultural and linguistic features with the Slovenes from Venetian Slovenia.

Slovenes of Trieste and Gorizia 

The Slovenes living in the Provinces of Trieste and Gorizia shared, until 1918, the same history with most other Slovenes: by the end of the 15th century, they were included in the Habsburg monarchy, and in the 19th Century they actively participated in the Slovene national revival. Between 1849 and 1918, they were part of the Austrian administrative region known as Austrian Littoral, and were known as Littoral Slovenes (Primorski Slovenci). After 1918, they came under Italian administration and were included in the region known as the Julian March (Venezia Giulia). They shared the same fate as other Slovenes in the Julian March: they were subjected to Fascist Italianization, which gave rise to pro-Yugoslav irredentism. In 1947, after World War II, a new border between Italy and Yugoslavia was drawn, dividing the Julian March between the two states. The border was artificial, insofar as it was not based on any significant historical or geographical divides. In many cases, the border separated families and ran through fields and estates. All these reasons contributed to the strong connection between the Slovenes who remained in Italy with their counterparts that were annexed to Yugoslavia.

Until the 1950s and 1960s, the Slovenes from the Provinces of Gorizia and Trieste frequently referred to themselves as Littoral Slovenes. Since the 1960s, this identification with the Slovenian Littoral has faded, but it can still be traced in the names of certain institutions, most notably in the title of the Slovene daily newspaper of Trieste, called Primorski dnevnik which means “The Littoral Daily”. Between the 1940s and 1960s, the Slovenes from the Provinces of Gorizia and Trieste established the infrastructure of minority organizations that now serve the needs of the whole minority. They have enjoyed a certain degree of cultural autonomy (the most important feature being the education system in Slovene) since 1945, and they have maintained strong relations with Slovenia, especially with the neighboring border areas of the Slovenian Littoral.
In 1986 the Slovenian community founded the football club Kras Repen, which locates its fan base among the Slovenes in Italy.

Venetian Slovenia 

Venetian Slovenia is the traditional name for Slovene-speaking areas in the valleys of upper Natisone and Torre rivers in eastern Friuli (currently in the Province of Udine). The history of these areas has been strongly linked to the history of Friuli. Unlike most other ethnic Slovene territories (including the areas of Gorizia and Trieste), this region was part of the Venetian Republic for around 350 years (hence the name of the region). During that period, they enjoyed a large degree of autonomy.

The Slovenes in this area were annexed to Italy together with the rest of the Venetia region in 1866, that is, half a century before the Slovenes of Gorizia and Trieste, who remained under Austrian rule until after World War I. 

For long, the identity of the local Slovenes was mostly a linguistic and, to an extent, an ethnic one, but not a national one. The Slovenes of these areas lacked any form of collective minority or linguistic rights until the year 2000, when the Law for the Defense of the Slovene-Speaking Minority was passed by the Italian Parliament.

Canale Valley Slovenes 
Around 3,000 Slovenes live in the Canale Valley in the north-easternmost part of the Province of Udine. The valley is currently divided among three municipalities: Tarvisio (Trbiž), Malborghetto Valbruna (Naborjet - Ovčja vas), and Pontebba (Tablja). Most of the local Slovenes live in the first two, representing around half of the population in Malborghetto Valbruna and a lower percentage in Tarvisio. 

Until 1918, the Canale Valley (Kanalska dolina) was part of the Austro-Hungarian Empire. Since the Middle Ages, it was a part of the Duchy of Carinthia. The local Slovene speakers shared the same history, traditions and linguistic features with other Carinthian Slovenes. According to the last Austrian census of 1910, the valley had around 9,000 inhabitants, among whom around a third were Slovene speakers, with the remainder German speakers. In 1918, after the end of World War I, the valley was occupied by the Italian Army, and in 1919 it was officially annexed to Italy. In the 1920s and 1930s, many Italians were settled in this area, which bordered both Austria and Yugoslavia. In 1939, the South Tyrol Option Agreement between Italy and Nazi Germany was also applied to ethnic Germans in the area; as a consequence, most of the German-speaking population was resettled to neighboring Carinthia. New settlers from other parts of Italy gradually took their place, which significantly altered the ethnic composition of the valley.

Nowadays, Slovene is still spoken in several villages in the valley, especially Valbruna (Ovčja vas), Camporosso in Valcanale (Žabnice), Ugovizza (Ukve), and San Leopoldo (Lipalja vas). There has been a revival of Slovene language in these villages after 1990, with a focus on the younger generations.

Resia Valley 

The inhabitants of the Resia Valley in north-western Friuli speak a specific dialect of Slovene, known as Resian. Due to its specific phonetic features and archaic grammar, Resian is not mutually intelligible with standard Slovene and with most other Slovene dialects. Historically and culturally (as well as linguistically), Resia could be considered a part of Venetian Slovenia. According to Italian and regional legislation, Resians are considered as part of the Slovene minority in Italy; however, there are strong local movements that oppose identification with Slovenes and Slovene language, and defend a separate Resian identity.

Notable Slovenes in Italy
Notable Slovenes, who were either born in what is today Italy, or who spent a considerable part of their lives in these area, include:

Actors, directors and showmen 
 Miranda Caharija, actress from Trieste
 Ferdo Delak, Slovenian-Croatian theatre director (born in Gorizia)
 George Dolenz, US actor (born in Trieste)
 Boris Kobal, comedian and director from Trieste
 Andro Merkù, comedian

Architects and designers 
 Franko Luin, Slovene-Swedish graphic designer from Trieste
 Boris Podrecca, Slovene-Austrian architect from Trieste
 Viktor Sulčič, Slovene Argentine architect, born in Santa Croce near Trieste

Authors 
 Vladimir Bartol, writer (born in Trieste, lived mostly in Ljubljana)
 France Bevk, writer (born near Cerkno, Slovenia, but lived in Gorizia between 1920-1943, and in Trieste, 1945-1952)
 Andrej Budal, writer and translator
 Igo Gruden, poet (born in Duino-Aurisina, lived mostly in Ljubljana)
 Dušan Jelinčič, writer and mountaineer from Trieste
 Jovan Vesel Koseski, poet (born in Carniola, but lived, worked and died in Trieste)
 Miroslav Košuta, poet from Trieste
 Boris Pahor, writer from Trieste
 Alojz Rebula, writer and essayist from San Pelagio (Duino-Aurisina)
 Josip Ribičič, writer (lived and worked in Trieste)
 Zora Tavčar, writer, essayist and translator (born in Loka pri Zidanem Mostu, Slovenia, but living and working in Villa Opicina, Trieste)
 Stanko Vuk, poet and Catholic political activist (born in Miren (Slovenia), but lived and died in Trieste)

Journalists 
 Jurij Gustinčič, Slovenian journalist (born in Trieste)
 Miran Hrovatin, photographer and camera operator from Trieste, killed in Somalia with the journalist Ilaria Alpi
 Demetrio Volcic (born in Ljubljana, but lived in Trieste)
 Sergio Tavčar, sport anchor from Trieste

Musicians 
 Edi Bucovaz, musician from Venetian Slovenia, founder of the Beneški fantje folk group
 Marij Kogoj, Slovenian composer (born in Trieste)
 Denis Novato, accordion player from Trieste

Painters 
 Milko Bambič, painter, illustrator, cartoonist, caricaturist, inventor, children's writer and author from Trieste
 Franc Kavčič, Classicist painter from Gorizia
 Avgust Černigoj, avant-garde painter from Trieste
 Gojmir Anton Kos, neo-historicist painter from Gorizia
 Zoran Mušič, modernist painter from Gorizia
Klavdij Palčič, abstract painter, scenographer, graphic designer and former director of The Slovenian Cultural and Economic Union, from Trieste
 Lojze Spacal, abstract painter from Trieste
 Lojze Spazzapan, modernist painter from Gradisca d'Isonzo
 Jožef Tominc, classicist painter from Gorizia
Edvard Stepančič, painter, from Trieste
Edvard Zajec, painter and graphic artist, from Trieste

Politicians 
 Engelbert Besednjak, Christian Democratic politician, Italian member in Parliament of the Kingdom of Italy (1924-1929)
 Darko Bratina, Sociologist and Center left politician, Italian senator (1992-1997)
 Miloš Budin, Left-wing politician, Italian Senator (2001-2006), and Government official (2006-2008)
 Ivan Marija Čok, Liberal politician and organizer
 Ivan Dolinar, Conservative politician, journalist and teacher
 Josip Ferfolja, Social Democrat politician
 Rudolf Golouh, Socialist politician, and trade union activist
 Ivan Nabergoj, Liberal Nationalist politician, Member of the Austrian Parliament
 Bogumil Remec, Christian Democratic politician and entrepreneur 
 Mitja Ribičič, Communist politician, prime minister of the SFR Yugoslavia (1969-1971)
 Josip Vilfan, Liberal politician, Italian member in Parliament of the Kingdom of Italy (1921-1929)

Psychotherapists 
 Alenka Rebula Tuta, psychotherapist, poet, and author
 Pavel Fonda, psychiatrist, psychotherapist, and politician

Resistance fighters and anti-Fascist activists 
 Ferdo Bidovec, anti-Fascist insurrectionist from Trieste, executed by the Fascist regime in 1930
 Lojze Bratuž, composer and Catholic activist from Gorizia, assassinated by Fascist squads
 Zorko Jelinčič, national liberal activist from Trieste, co-founder of the TIGR organization
 Fran Marušič, anti-Fascist insurrectionist from Basovizza (Trieste), executed by the Fascist regime in 1930
 Zvonimir Miloš, Slovene-Croat anti-Fascist insurrectionist from Trieste, executed by the Fascist regime in 1930
 Pinko Tomažič, Communist activist from Trieste, executed by the Fascist regime in 1941
 Ivan Regent, Communist activist from Trieste

Scholars 
 Milko Brezigar, Yugoslav economist (born in Doberdò del Lago)
 Lavo Čermelj, Slovene anti-Fascist immigrant from Trieste; physicist, political activist and public intellectual
 Boris Furlan, jurist, legal theorist (born in Trieste)
 Boris M. Gombač, historian from Trieste
 Ivo Kerže, philosopher from Trieste
 Franc Kos, historian (lived and worked in Gorizia)
 Milko Kos, historian (born in Gorizia)
 Niko Kuret, ethnologist (born in Trieste)
 Alessio Lokar, economist and essayist from Gorizia
 Pavle Merkù, ethnomusicologist 
 Avgust Pirjevec, literary scholar (born in Gorizia)
 Jože Pirjevec, historian from Trieste
 Igor Škamperle, sociologist and writer from Trieste
 Božo Škerlj, anthropologist (born in Trieste)
 Vladimir Truhlar, theologian and poet (born in Gorizia)
 Marta Verginella, historian from Trieste
 Sergij Vilfan, historian (born in Trieste)

Sports 
 Arianna Bogatec, sailer
 Matej Černic, volleyball player
 Claudia Coslovich, athlete (javelin throw)
 Lorenzo Crisetig, football player
 Gregor Fučka, former basketball player for the Italian national team 
 Barbara Lah, triple jumper
 Edoardo Reja, football coach
 Lidija Rupnik, gymnast 
 Giorgio Ursi, racing cyclist

Others 
 Sergej Mašera, Yugoslav naval officier, military hero, born in Gorizia
 Edvard Rusjan, pioneer aviator, born in Trieste, lived in Gorizia
 Jožko Šavli, author, amateur historian from Gorizia
 Sigmund Zois, Enlightenment figure and entrepreneur, born in Trieste

Italians of Slovene descent 
Besides members of the Slovene ethnic minority, many notable Italians have Slovene family background. Italian naturalized citizens of Slovenian background are also usually not considered to be part of the Slovene autochthonous minority, unless they reside in the areas of traditional Slovene settlement and partake in the community life of the minority.

Famous Italians of Slovene descent include:

Gianni Bisiach, film director and author (Slovene parents from Gorizia)
Andrea Bosic, actor (Slovene-born, from Maribor)
Marco Castellani, musician (Slovene mother)
Roberto Chiacig, basketball player (Slovene family from Venetian Slovenia)
Roberto Cosolini, Mayor of Trieste (since 2010), Slovene mother
Armando Cossutta, politician, president of the Communist Refoundation Party (1991-1998) and the Party of Italian Communists, 1998-2000 (Slovene father)
Danilo Dolci, pedagogue and activist (born in Sežana, Slovenia, Slovene mother)
Michl Ebner, politician (Slovene maternal grandfather from Polzela)
Pietro Fanna, football player (family of Slovene descent, from Venetian Slovenia)
Gregor Fučka, basketball player (Slovenian-born)
Giorgio Gaber (stage name of Giorgio Gaberscik), singer, songwriter and performer, father of Slovene descent (from the Goriška region)
Franco Giraldi, screenwriter and film director (born in Komen, Slovenia, Slovene mother)
Gaetano Kanizsa, psychologist (Slovene mother from Trieste)
Guglielmo Oberdan, Italian nationalist activist and irredentist (Slovene mother from Ozeljan, Slovenia)
Giuseppe Pagano (born as Giuseppe Pogatschnig), Italian architect (father of Slovene descent)
Giorgio Strehler, theatre director (Slovene mother from Barcola, Trieste)
Walter Veltroni, politician, former Deputy Prime Minister of Italy (1996-1998), and Mayor of Rome, 2001-2008 (Slovene grandfather from Carinthia, Ciril Kotnik)

See also
Slovene minority in Italy (1920–1947)

References

External links

Ethnic groups in Italy
Slovenian diaspora